Adrienne Fay von Tunzelmann  (born c. 1947) is an executive director from New Zealand.

Biography 
Von Tunzelmann graduated from the University of Canterbury in the late 1960s with an honours degree in economics. Her first job offer after graduation was at a major bank, on a lower salary scale reserved for women. She declined the offer and instead joined the New Zealand Treasury, which offered equal pay for men and women staff. She worked in Parliament and Treasury until 1990, then moved to work at the Department of Justice. In 1985, von Tunzelmann was the first woman to become Deputy Clerk of the House. While working, she also completed a master's degree in public policy at Victoria University of Wellington. 

In 2001, von Tunzelmann moved to Tauranga and set up a private consultancy business.

She served for 14 years on the governing body of Te Whare Wānanga o Awanuiārangi, a Ngāti Awa tertiary education organisation for Māori in the eastern Bay of Plenty. She has also served as chair of the board of Bone Health New Zealand. She has been the chairwoman of the New Zealand Women's Refuge Foundation, vice president of Age Concern New Zealand and a patron of the Tauranga Community Housing Trust, which provides housing for people with disabilities. She has also served as president of the Tauranga Chamber of Commerce.

Personal life 
Von Tunzelmann is married to Peter McKinlay. She is the great-grandniece of pioneer explorer Nicholas von Tunzelmann.

Honours and awards 
In 1977, von Tunzelmann received the Queen Elizabeth II Silver Jubilee Medal, and in 1993, she was awarded the New Zealand Suffrage Centennial Medal. In the 2016 Birthday Honours, she was appointed a Companion of the Queen's Service Order, for services to governance and the community.

References

Living people
University of Canterbury alumni
Companions of the Queen's Service Order
Victoria University of Wellington alumni
1940s births
Recipients of the New Zealand Suffrage Centennial Medal 1993